The 2005 Seattle Seahawks season was the franchise's 30th season in the National Football League (NFL), their fourth playing their home games at Qwest Field and their seventh  season under head coach Mike Holmgren. They won the National Football Conference (NFC) Championship Game and played in Super Bowl XL, which they lost 21–10 to the Pittsburgh Steelers. The Seahawks compiled a 13–3 record in the regular season, easily winning the NFC West and earning the NFC top seed, thus clinching home field advantage in the NFC playoffs for the first time in franchise history. There, they beat the Washington Redskins and Carolina Panthers to win the George Halas Trophy, and advance to their first ever Super Bowl. Combining the regular season and postseason, the Seahawks finished with a perfect 10–0 record at Qwest Field. The 2005 team was widely considered the best team in club history until the Super Bowl XLVIII championship. The 2005 season was also the team's 30th anniversary season in the NFL. The Seahawks were the only NFC team from the 2004 playoffs to qualify for the 2005 playoffs.

The Seahawks touted Pro Bowlers on offense, and boasted season MVP, running back Shaun Alexander, who would eventually break Priest Holmes's single-season touchdown record, with 28 total touchdowns. Alexander also led the league in rushing yards for the second consecutive year, which in turn helped the Seahawks lead the league in scoring. The offense was led by 7th-year veteran quarterback Matt Hasselbeck, who compiled a career-high and NFC leading 98.2 passer rating, while completing 65.5% of his passes, earning his second trip to the Pro Bowl. Future Hall of Famers Walter Jones and Steve Hutchinson anchored the offensive line at left tackle and guard respectively, and Mack Strong effectively blocked and rushed from the backfield at fullback on his way to a 2005 All-Pro Team selection. The team scored a franchise record 452 points, a record that stood until the 2020 team surpassed it with 459 points scored.

Although Seattle's strength was attributed to their offense, they were strong on the defensive side of the ball as well. The Seahawks compiled an NFL-leading 50 quarterback sacks, with defensive end Bryce Fisher leading the franchise with nine, while defensive tackle Rocky Bernard added 8.5 and veteran defensive end Grant Wistrom recorded four. Despite starting two rookies at linebacker for most of the year, the Seattle linebacking corps played well, led by Pro Bowler Lofa Tatupu, who topped the team with 104 tackles and added four sacks, three interceptions, and one fumble recovery. In the secondary, Michael Boulware led the team with four interceptions and also tallied two sacks and one fumble recovery, however Seattle suffered injuries throughout the year, notably to free safety Ken Hamlin. A bright spot in relief, second-year cornerback Jordan Babineaux played well as he appeared in all sixteen games for Seattle, intercepting three passes and making 61 tackles. For the season, the Seahawks defense ranked 7th in points allowed, surrendering just 271 total, 181 fewer than the Seahawks offense scored.

Offseason
The period between the disappointing 2004 season and the start of the 2005 season was marked by major changes for the Seahawks, starting with the front office. Team owner Paul Allen fired eight-year incumbent General Manager Bob Whitsitt on January 14, the same day that Vice President of Football Operations Ted Thompson was hired away by the Green Bay Packers to be their general manager. Rumors had been floating that Whitsitt's relationship with coach Mike Holmgren (and almost everyone else) was strained and Holmgren later admitted that he had thought about leaving the team after a 2004 season that was personally draining. At the time of Whitsitt's firing the Seahawks salary cap situation was in extreme flux with 16 unsigned free agents on the roster including their three biggest stars Matt Hasselbeck, Shaun Alexander and Walter Jones. On February 3 Mike Reinfeldt, who had previously been pushed out of the Seahawks organization by Whitsitt, was hired back as a consultant to try to sort out the mess. Reinfeldt was able to sign Jones and Hasselbeck to long-term deals and put the Franchise Tag on Alexander, setting the stage for the rest of the off-season.

After a careful executive search the Seahawks settled on highly regarded personnel man Tim Ruskell as the new President of Football Operations on February 23, 2005. As a part of his roster overhaul, Ruskell subsequently released or neglected to re-sign six players (Anthony Simmons, Chad Brown, Orlando Huff, Chike Okeafor, Rashad Moore and Cedric Woodard) who were starters on an underperforming defense during the 2004 season. Over the rest of the offseason and into training camp Ruskell signed a raft of free agents to replace departed players on both sides of the ball, emphasizing character and work ethic in his evaluations.

In the first round of the 2005 NFL Draft the Seahawks traded down from pick 23 to pick 26 to select center Chris Spencer from the University of Mississippi and acquire an extra fourth-round pick. They then gave up two fourth-round picks to trade up into the second round and select USC linebacker Lofa Tatupu, who would start every game of the 2005 season and go to the Pro Bowl as a rookie.

NFL draft

Undrafted free agents

Final roster

     Starters in bold.
 (*) Denotes players that were selected for the 2006 Pro Bowl. The Seahawks had seven players selected, tying a franchise record set in 1984
 (†) Denotes players selected as replacement players for the 2006 Pro Bowl. C Robbie Tobeck and rookie MLB Lofa Tatupu were added to the Roster after injuries to Chicago's Brian Urlacher and Olin Kreutz.

Awards and Records
 Shaun Alexander, Bert Bell Award and NFL MVP.

Schedule

Preseason

Regular season

Bold indicates division opponents.
Source: 2005 NFL season results

Postseason

Standings

Game summaries

Preseason

Week P1: at New Orleans Saints

Week P2: vs. Dallas Cowboys

Week P3: at Kansas City Chiefs

Week P4: vs. Minnesota Vikings

Regular season
The Seahawks got off to a rocky start on their 2005 (30th Anniversary) campaign but it would end with their first Super Bowl appearance.
When the St. Louis Rams lost on December 4, 2005, the Seahawks clinched their second straight NFC West title after playing only 11 games.
At the end of the regular season, the Seahawks' use of the 12th man was challenged by Texas A&M University, who holds a trademark of the phrase. The dispute was settled out of court on May 8, 2006 with an agreement that the Seahawks be permitted to continue use of the slogan with acknowledgment to Texas A&M.

Week 1: at Jacksonville Jaguars

Jacksonville's defense forced the Seahawks into five turnovers, including two interceptions of Hasselbeck, en route to a 26–14 victory. The Jaguars held Shaun Alexander to 73 yards on 14 attempts and no touchdowns as the Seahawks started the season 0–1.

Week 2: vs. Atlanta Falcons

For their home opener, the Seahawks faced the same team they beat in the last game of the 2004 regular season, the Atlanta Falcons. Seattle outgained Atlanta 428–223, and the game remained close until the final drive. On Atlanta's last drive Bryce Fisher sacked Michael Vick on third down, and on the next play, Andre Dyson knocked down Matt Schaub's 4th down pass. Shaun Alexander rushed for 144 yards and a touchdown. All of Seattle's points were scored in the second quarter.

Week 3: vs. Arizona Cardinals

In week three, Seattle defeated the division rival Arizona Cardinals 37–12. Shaun Alexander rushed for 140 yards and four touchdowns. The Seahawks' defense forced its first turnover of the season, including a fumble recovery following a sack of Josh McCown by Michael Boulware at the Arizona 1. The Seahawks capitalized, with Shaun Alexander scoring on the next play.

Week 4: at Washington Redskins

The following week, the Seahawks were on the road against the Washington Redskins. Kicker Josh Brown missed a what would've game-winning field goal attempt late in regulation. The game went into overtime and the Seahawks lost 20–17 after a 39-yard field goal by Redskins kicker Nick Novak.

Week 5: at St. Louis Rams

The Seahawks went to the Edward Jones Dome to face their division-rival, the St. Louis Rams. It was their first meeting since the 2004 playoff game. The Rams returned the opening kickoff 99 yards for a touchdown. Led by Joe Jurevicius's 9 receptions for 137 yards and 1 touchdown, Matt Hasselbeck's 27 completions for 316 yards, 2 touchdowns and no interceptions, and Shaun Alexander's 119 yards and 2 touchdowns, Seattle racked up 433 yards of total offense. The defense recorded 2 takeaways in the second half, an interception by Lofa Tatupu and a fumble recovery on a punt by J. P. Darche with 2:51 left in the game. The Seahawks ended a 4-game losing streak to the Rams, and received their first win in St. Louis since 1997.

Week 6: vs. Houston Texans

The Seahawks returned home for a Sunday night game against the Houston Texans. The Seahawks easily won, led by Shaun Alexander's 144 yards and four touchdowns, winning by a score of 42–10. Seattle set a team record with 320 yards rushing. This was the first ever meeting of these two teams and first meeting with a Houston NFL team since the 1996 season.

Week 7: vs. Dallas Cowboys

The Seahawk defense had an exceptional game, recording five sacks and two interceptions against the Dallas Cowboys. The key play occurred when second-year defensive back Jordan Babineaux intercepted opposing quarterback Drew Bledsoe's pass, the second interception of the day, and returned it 25 yards, setting the stage for kicker Josh Brown's game-winning 50-yard field goal as time expired. The Seahawks won 13–10.

Week 9: at Arizona Cardinals

After their Week 8 bye, the Seahawks traveled to Sun Devil Stadium and completed a season sweep of the Cardinals by a score of 33–19. The defense recorded four sacks and three interceptions of quarterback Kurt Warner. Shaun Alexander tied his own team record with an 88-yard touchdown run on the first play of the third quarter and finished the day with 173 yards and two touchdowns.

Week 10: vs. St. Louis Rams

The Seahawks returned home and finished off a season sweep of the Rams for the first time since the 2002 realignment, with a 31–16 victory. The Rams had a 3–0 lead early, when on fourth down they went for a fake field goal, but was unsuccessful. The Seahawks proceeded to put together an 87-yard drive that ended in a touchdown for a 7–3 lead. From that point the Seahawks went on to outgain the Rams 281–46, building a 24–6 lead. The Rams narrowed it to 24–16, but led by Shaun Alexander's 165 yards and three touchdowns, the game was put away with his 17-yard touchdown burst with 1:12 left. Matt Hasselbeck contributed with 17 completions, 243 yards, one touchdown and two interceptions. Seattle made 10 out of 15 third down conversions.

Week 11: at San Francisco 49ers

The Seahawks went to Monster Park to take on the division rival San Francisco 49ers. The Seahawks led 27–12 going into the fourth quarter, but the comfortable lead would not last. In the final seconds, the 49ers got within two points with a 1-yard touchdown run by Maurice Hicks. The 49ers failed the two point conversion attempt, and Seattle held on for the win by a score of 27–25.

Week 12: vs. New York Giants

The Seahawks returned home and played eventual NFC East champion New York Giants. With the score tied 21–21, opposing kicker Jay Feely missed three chances for a winning field goal (one as time expired in regulation and two in overtime). The Seahawks won on a 36-yard Josh Brown field goal and the Seahawks won by a final score of 24–21. Seahawks gunslinger Matt Hasselbeck threw for 249 yards and two TDs in Seattle's 24–21 overtime victory over the New York Giants. This game is also remembered for the raucous noise inside Qwest Field which caused 11 false start penalties against the Giants.

Week 13: at Philadelphia Eagles

On December 5, 2005, in a game dubbed "The Monday Night Massacre" by NFL Films, the Seahawks shut out the Philadelphia Eagles 42–0 with three defensive touchdowns (two interceptions, one fumble return) to tie the then-largest margin of victory mark in Monday Night Football history. They also set the mark for the greatest margin of victory in a Monday Night shutout, as well as set the NFL record for scoring the most points with under 200 yards of offense. A fourth interception return by Michael Boulware fell just short of tying another Seahawks NFL record of four defensive scores in a single game, set during a 45–0 victory over the Kansas City Chiefs in 1984. This win also marked the first time since 2003 the Seahawks were able to hold an opponent scoreless. The defeat was the Eagles third worst in team history.

Week 14: vs. San Francisco 49ers

A week after their rout of the Eagles in Philadelphia, the Seahawks came home and routed the 49ers 41–3 to complete their first ever division sweep of either the NFC or AFC West. Against the Eagles and 49ers, Seattle won by a combined score of 83–3. They outgained the 49ers 438–113 in total yards. Matt Hasselbeck had his best game of the season, with 21 completions for 226 yards and a season-high four touchdown passes.

Week 15: at Tennessee Titans

After their rout of the 49ers, the Seahawks traveled to The Coliseum to face the Tennessee Titans. Coming into the second half, the score was tied at 14. After the third quarter, the Seahawks trailed 24–21. Matt Hasselbeck completed the fourth quarter comeback, throwing a game-winning 2-yard pass to wide receiver Bobby Engram. The Seahawks won 28–24. Seahawks quarterback Matt Hasselbeck went 21-of-27 for 287 yards with 2 TDs and a passer rating of 147.7. Running back Shaun Alexander rushed for 172 yards on 26 carries. Titans signal-caller Steve McNair threw for 310 yards and 2 TDs in a losing effort.

Week 16: vs. Indianapolis Colts

On Christmas Eve, the Seahawks beat the Colts 28–13, setting the franchise record for the most wins in one season with 13. Shaun Alexander scored three touchdowns in the game and tied Priest Holmes for the NFL record for touchdowns in a season with 27. The victory also clinched the top seed in the NFC playoffs for the Seahawks, assuring them of a home playoff game during the weekend of January 14–15, 2006 against the lowest remaining NFC seed (which turned out to be the Washington Redskins). The Colts-Seahawks matchup featured interesting storylines even before the kickoff. The game featured the highest scoring and winningest teams against each other, and each looking to set a franchise record for most wins in a season. In addition, the schedule makers set a record with the first regular season game where the teams combined for at least 25 victories. Coming into the game, the Colts had already clinched the #1 seed in the AFC playoffs, and the Seahawks were looking to clinch the #1 in the NFC playoffs with a win. After the Colts took the lead with a field goal, a kickoff return by Josh Scobey set up the Seahawks' first score, a 2-yard run by Alexander. The Colts second offensive drive ended in a 31-yard blocked field goal attempt by Mike Vanderjagt which pushed assistant coach Jim Caldwell's decision to rest Peyton Manning and many other Colts starters for the remaining three quarters of the game. Matt Hasselbeck threw a touchdown to tight-end Jerramy Stevens for a 14–3 Seahawks lead. After a field goal cut the lead to 14–6, Seattle put the game out of reach. First, Hasselbeck connected with Alexander for a 21–6 lead. Then, Alexander scored again to put the game away, 28–6. The Colts scored on a 6-yard pass from Jim Sorgi to Troy Walters to cut the lead to 28–13, but Scobey recovered the ensuing onside kick and Seattle ran out the clock to hold on for a 28–13 win.

Week 17: at Green Bay Packers

On January 1, 2006, despite losing to the Green Bay Packers 23–17, Shaun Alexander broke Priest Holmes's record for most touchdowns in a single season, with his 28th touchdown coming in the 2nd quarter of the game. He ended the season with the league's most rushing yards for the season with 1,880 yards, and led the league in points scored (168 points). Four days later, he was named the 2005 NFL MVP. For the season, the Seahawks as a team led the league with most points scored that season (452), as well as the most sacks with 50.

Postseason

Seattle entered the postseason as the #1 seed in the NFC. They were the only 2004-05 NFC playoff team to return for the 2005-06 playoffs.

NFC Divisional Playoff: vs. #6 Washington Redskins

After having a first round bye in the playoffs, the Seahawks hosted the Washington Redskins in the Divisional Playoffs. Shaun Alexander suffered a concussion in the first quarter, but the Seahawks managed to prevail by a final score of 20–10. The win ended the franchise's 21-year playoff victory drought. Matt Hasselbeck led the way completing a 16 of 26 passes for 215 yards and 1 TD, while running for another, a 6-yard scamper in the 3rd quarter.

Mack Strong's career high 38-yard run set up the game clincher, a 31-yard field goal by Josh Brown giving Seattle a 20–10 victory with just under 3 minutes left in the game.

NFC Championship Game: vs. #5 Carolina Panthers

On January 22, 2006, the team clinched its first Super Bowl berth in franchise history, with a commanding 34–14 win over the Carolina Panthers. Seattle completely dominated the game from start to finish, racking up 393 total yards to Carolina's 212, and out-rushing Carolina 190 – 36. Seattle's defense intercepted Jake Delhomme 3 times, and DT Rocky Benard recorded 2 sacks. Shaun Alexander rushed for 134 yards on 34 attempts and 2 TD's. Matt Hasselbeck went 20 out of 28 for 219 yards and 2 TD's. The Seahawks stormed out to a 17–0 lead before the Panthers' Steve Smith returned a punt 59 yards for a TD, making the score 17–7. Entering the third quarter with 20–7 lead, Seattle took the opening possession of the 2nd half and scored on a Matt Hasselbeck to Bobby Engram TD pass. Midway through the 4th quarter Shaun Alexander added a 1-yard TD run to make it 34–7, putting the game away. With this win, Seattle finished the season a perfect 10–0 at home.

Super Bowl XL: vs. #A6 Pittsburgh Steelers

Seattle fell short in its bid for its first NFL title, losing to the Pittsburgh Steelers at Super Bowl XL in Detroit, Michigan on February 5, 2006 by a score of 21–10. Although the Seahawks outgained the Steelers, 396 yards to 339, Pittsburgh won on the strength of three big plays converted for touchdowns. Seattle, on the other hand, seemed unable to convert on many of their offensive opportunities. Several controversial calls by the officials during the game wrongfully nullified key plays made by the Seahawks that some feel could have changed the outcome of the game.

The several controversial calls made during Super Bowl XL were met with criticism from both fans and members of the media, as many suggested that the officials had wrongly overturned several key plays made by the Seattle offense. Jason Whitlock, writing for the Kansas City Star, encapsulated many views when he wrote the day after the game, "Leavy and his crew ruined Super Bowl XL. Am I the only one who would like to hear them defend their incompetence?"  In response to the criticisms, NFL spokesman Greg Aiello said in a statement, "The game was properly officiated, including, as in most NFL games, some tight plays that produced disagreement about the calls made by the officials." The game ended a playoffs season that was plagued by complaints about officiating.

On August 6, 2010, while visiting the Seahawks' preseason training camp for an annual rules interpretation session with the Seattle media, head official Bill Leavy brought up Super Bowl XL without being asked, while admitting to having blown calls:

References

External links
 Seahawks draft history at NFL.com

Seattle Seahawks
NFC West championship seasons
National Football Conference championship seasons
Seattle Seahawks seasons
Seattle Seahawks